Nastassja Martin (born 1986) is a French anthropologist and writer. She specialises in the populations of the Far North.

Martin is known for her story Croire aux fauves (In the Eye of the Wild) in which she describes her attack by a bear.

Life 
Martin was born in Grenoble. She studied anthropology at the Ecole des Hautes Etudes en Sciences Sociales.

Martin joined the Gwich'in, a hunter-gatherer society, in Alaska, to complete a thesis under the supervision of Philippe Descola.

In 2016, she published Wild Souls, the story of her experience in Alaska with this population.

In August 2015, while she was in the mountains of Kamchatka, on the borders of Siberia, to carry out an anthropological study among the Evenes, Nastassja Martin was attacked by a bear. The animal disfigured her; she lost a piece of her jaw. Months of hospitalization followed in Russia, then in Paris. From this experience, she wrote a story which was released in October 2019. Croire aux fauves recounts her encounter with the bear, her rebirth and her animist vision of the world.

In 2020, she took part in a committee against a project to extend the ski area to La Grave and the Massif des Écrins.

Her book A l'est des rêves was published in 2022, sharing her anthropological approach.

Works 

 Les Âmes sauvages : face à l'Occident, la résistance d’un peuple d’Alaska, Paris, La Découverte, 2016.  
 Croire aux fauves, Paris, Verticales, 2019, 
 In the Eye of the Wild translator Sophie R. Lewis. New York Review Books, 2021.  
 À l'Est des rêves, La Découverte, 2022.

References 

French anthropologists
1986 births
Living people
People from Grenoble